Seán Óg Flood (born 1935) is an Irish former Gaelic footballer. His league and championship careers with the senior Louth and Cavan county teams lasted ten seasons from 1955 until 1964.

Born in Dundalk, County Louth, Flood first played competitive Gaelic football with the Young Irelands club at minor level in 1950. He won a North Louth minor championship medal that year, before joining the senior team in 1953. Flood was the first-choice goalkeeper until 1960 and featured on two Cardinal O'Donnell Cup-winning teams.

Flood first appeared on the inter-county scene as a member of the Louth Minor team in 1953. He won a Leinster medal that year before being added to the senior panel in 1955. Flood made his league debut in 1956 and was handed his first championship start in 1957. His debut championship season saw him win a set of All-Ireland and Leinster medals. After transferring to the Cavan senior team in 1961, Flood went on to win a Ulster and Dr. McKenna Cup medals. He retired from inter-county Gaelic football in 1964.

As a member of the Leinster inter-provincial team on a number of occasions, Flood won one Railway Cup medal.

Honours
Young Irelands
North Louth Minor Football Championship (1): 1953

Louth
All-Ireland Senior Football Championship (1): 1957
Leinster Senior Football Championship (1): 1957
Leinster Minor Football Championship (1): 1953

Cavan
Ulster Senior Football Championship (1): 1962
Dr McKenna Cup (1): 1962
Ulster Junior Football Championship (1): 1962

References

1935 births
Living people
Louth inter-county Gaelic footballers
Cavan inter-county Gaelic footballers
ESB people
Gaelic football goalkeepers
Irish salespeople